Thorsten Weidner (born 29 December 1967) is a German fencer. He won a silver medal in the team foil event at the 1988 Summer Olympics and a gold in the same event at the 1992 Summer Olympics.

Biography
Thorsten Weidner attended the Kaufmännische Schule Tauberbischofsheim and fought for the Fencing-Club Tauberbischofsheim.

References

External links
 

1967 births
Living people
People from Lauda-Königshofen
Sportspeople from Stuttgart (region)
German male fencers
Olympic fencers of West Germany
Olympic fencers of Germany
Fencers at the 1988 Summer Olympics
Fencers at the 1992 Summer Olympics
Olympic silver medalists for West Germany
Olympic gold medalists for Germany
Olympic medalists in fencing
Medalists at the 1988 Summer Olympics
Medalists at the 1992 Summer Olympics